The World Scout Indaba was a gathering of Scout Leaders from around the world. Created at the 1949 12th World Scout Conference in Elvesæter, Norway where The Boy Scouts Association of the United Kingdom submitted that of the great number of Scouters working in a Pack, Troop or Crew, only a very small percentage were ever able to take part in a major international Scout gathering. The suggestion for the title came from Lord Rowallan after one of his African tours, the term indaba being a Zulu language word meaning "tribal conference".

It appears that only three such events were held:

 1st World Scout Indaba, Gilwell Park, United Kingdom, July, 1952
 2nd World Scout Indaba, Sutton Coldfield, United Kingdom, June, 1957, combined with the 9th World Scout Jamboree and 6th World Rover Moot, to celebrate 50 years of Scouting
 3rd World Scout Indaba, Ommen, Netherlands, August, 1960

1st World Scout Indaba
The 1st World Scout Indaba took place at Gilwell Park, for a week in July, 1952. The organization was in the hands of Fred Hurll, Chief Executive Commissioner, and of John Frederick Colquhoun, The Boy Scouts Association Headquarters Commissioner for Relationships. Lord Rowallan, as Chief Scout of The Boy Scouts Association, opened the Indaba, expressing the hope that it would be looked upon as an historic occasion in the story of Scouting. The numbers attending were far below any estimate worked out beforehand, and amounted to only 500 men and women. However, this created a cheerfulness and friendliness that would have been difficult to achieve otherwise. Separate discussion groups were held for Wolf Cubs, Boy Scouts, handicapped Scouts, "the Older Scout", Rovers and Commissioners, and reports from each group were given at a plenary session attended by the whole Indaba. Prince Henry, Duke of Gloucester, as president of the British Scout Association, brought the Indaba to a close with these words: "Let it be the determination of all who have been here at Gilwell to spread the Scout spirit wherever they go, that spirit of peace and friendliness which is so sorely needed in the world today." The experiment was counted a success, and the International Committee recommended continuing them every four years, with a limitation of a thousand participants.

2nd World Scout Indaba
The 2nd World Scout Indaba was held in June, 1957 to mark the 50th jubilee year of Scouting and the centenary of the birth of Robert Baden-Powell, 1st Baron Baden-Powell. It was held concurrent with the 9th World Scout Jamboree and 6th World Rover Moot held adjacent to each other, as well as the third Girl Guide World Camp. This vast undertaking was under the leadership of Sir Rob Lockhart, Deputy Chief Scout, as Camp Chief; Fred Hurll, Chief Executive Commissioner, as Deputy Camp Chief; and Kenneth H. Stevens, Camp Chief's Deputy at Gilwell Park, as the Executive Commissioner. The Jamboree-Indaba-Moot, known as JIM, was opened by Prince Henry, Duke of Gloucester on August 1, in the presence of some 30,000 members of the Scout brotherhood from 85 different parts of the world who camped at Sutton Park, and of the 17,000 other British Scouts in organized camps within a 15-mile radius. By some the twelve days were named Jamborain. The closing talk was given by Olave, Lady Baden-Powell, on the night of August 12, alternately in English and French.

3rd World Scout Indaba
3rd World Scout Indaba, Gilwell Ada's Hoeve, Netherlands, August, 1960.

References

External links
Reference to all three Indabas

Scouting events
Scouting jamborees